Jonathan Ernest is a Mauritian football striker for AS Port-Louis 2000.

References

Year of birth missing (living people)
Living people
Mauritian footballers
Mauritius international footballers
AS Port-Louis 2000 players
Association football forwards